Ninan is a male given name popular among the Saint Thomas Christians (Nasranis) of Kerala, India.

Ninan may also refer to:

Places
 Ninan, Haryana, a village in Haryana, India

People
 Ajit Ninan (born 1955), Indian political cartoonist
 Delsy Ninan (fl. from 2005), Indian playback singe
 Juby Ninan (fl. from 2013), Indian actor
 K. N. Ninan (born 1950), ecological economist
 Reena Ninan (born 1979), American television journalist
 Ryan Ninan (born 1985), Indian first-class cricketer 
 Sathish Ninan (born 1968), Indian judge
 Sevanti Ninan (fl. from 1980), Indian journalist

See also